Atympanum nigrofasciatum is an insect which belongs to the Acrididae family. The scientific name of this species was first published in 1984 by Yin

References

Acrididae